Yaremche is a city in Nadvirna Raion, Ivano-Frankivsk Oblast (province) of west Ukraine. Yaremche hosts the administration of Yaremche urban hromada, one of the hromadas of Ukraine. Population: .

Yaremche hosts the headquarters of the nearby Carpathian National Nature Park.

History

A possible root of the word "Yaremche" comes from the Turkish. In Turkic languages "yarım" means "half" and "yarımca" means "little half".
It was founded in 1787 and received city status on December 30, 1977.
In the interwar period (1918–1939) it belonged to Poland and was the most popular tourist center in eastern part of the Carpathian Mountains (in the late 1920s more than 6 000 guests came there yearly). Yaremche was growing year by year in importance and number of tourists. According to some, it had the chance to achieve same importance as other key Polish mountain spas, Zakopane and Krynica. However, in September 1939 it was captured by Soviet troops and became a part of Soviet Union as part of the Ukrainian SSR. During the World War II it was part of the Distrikt Galizien and was liberated by the Soviet forces in 1944. On December 30, 1977, the city of Yaremcha became a municipality within Ivano-Frankivsk Oblast. Since 1991 it has been a part of independent Ukraine.

There are a number of interesting houses with long sloping roofs. Next to this there is a swinging pedestrian toll bridge.

On December 14, 2006, the Parliament of Ukraine, officially renamed the city from Yaremcha to "Yaremche". The decision was based on the results of a city referendum, as well as the recommendations of City Council, and Ivano-Frankivsk Oblast Council.

Until 18 July 2020, Yaremche was incorporated as a city of oblast significance and was the center of Yaremche Municipality which also included the urban-type settlement of Vorokhta, a ski resort, and five other villages: Mykulychyn, Polianytsia, Tatariv, Voronenko, and Yablunytsia. The municipality was abolished in July 2020 as part of the administrative reform of Ukraine, which reduced the number of raions of Ivano-Frankivsk Oblast to six. The area of Yaremche Municipality was merged into Nadvirna Raion.

Gallery

Location 
Local orientation

Regional orientation

References

External links

 The Parliament renamed Yaremcha
 Yaremche - photographs
 Yaremche

Cities in Ivano-Frankivsk Oblast
Cities of regional significance in Ukraine
1787 establishments in the Polish–Lithuanian Commonwealth
Pokuttia
Populated places on the Prut